Théophile Nicolas Noblot (11 January 1824, Arconville - 17 June 1891) was a French republican politician. He was a member of the National Assembly in 1871 and of the Chamber of Deputies from 1883 to 1889.

References

1824 births
1891 deaths
People from Aube
Politicians from Grand Est
Opportunist Republicans
Members of the National Assembly (1871)
Members of the 3rd Chamber of Deputies of the French Third Republic
Members of the 4th Chamber of Deputies of the French Third Republic